Medina Wharf Railway Station was a private halt between Cowes and Newport on the Isle of Wight that provided a way for workers at the nearby wharf to get to work before the road was laid. No shelter for its few passengers was ever provided  and it never appeared on a public timetable. Additionally a non-passenger-carrying coal train transported coal from the siding via the halt to Ryde. After the Southern Railway took over from the IWCR the whole complex was extensively rebuilt.

After the closure of the passenger station in 1966, freight traffic continued for about a year until the track was lifted in the early 1970s. The trackway is now part of NCN route 23.

References

See also 

 List of closed railway stations in Britain

Disused railway stations on the Isle of Wight
Former Isle of Wight Central Railway stations
Railway stations in Great Britain opened in 1896
Railway stations in Great Britain closed in 1966
Former private railway stations